Arthur Chapman may refer to:

 Arthur Chapman (English cricketer) (1834–1867), English cricketer
 Arthur Chapman (agent) (1838–1909), businessman in Adelaide, South Australia
 Arthur Chapman (New Zealand cricketer) (1861–1950), New Zealand cricketer
 Arthur Chapman (Missouri politician) (1863–1928), American businessman and politician
 Arthur Chapman (poet) (1873–1935), American cowboy poet and newspaper columnist
 Percy Chapman (1900–1961), English cricketer, full name Arthur Percy Frank Chapman
 Art Chapman (1905–1962), Canadian ice hockey player
 Arthur B. Chapman (1908–2004), British-American animal genetic researcher
 Art Chapman (basketball) (1912–1986), Canadian basketball player